Lambrate is a station on Line 2 of the Milan Metro in the Lambrate district of Milan. It was opened on 27 September 1969 as part of the inaugural section of Line 2, between Cascina Gobba and Caiazzo.

The station is located at the Piazza Enrico Bottini, in front of Milano Lambrate railway station, and has been connected to it by a tunnel since December 2010.

References

External links

Line 2 (Milan Metro) stations
Railway stations opened in 1969
1969 establishments in Italy
Railway stations in Italy opened in the 20th century